Biddle is a surname. Notable people with the surname include:

Philadelphia family

Alexander Biddle (1819-1899), American businessman
Algernon Sydney Biddle (1847-1891), American lawyer and law professor at the University of Pennsylvania Law School
Anthony Joseph Drexel Biddle Sr. (1874–1948), Philadelphia millionaire
Charles Biddle (1745–1821), Vice-President of Pennsylvania
Charles John Biddle (1819–1873), American congressman and editor
Clement Biddle (1740–1814), American Revolutionary War soldier and quartermaster general
Edward Biddle (1738–1779), American lawyer and statesman
Francis Biddle (1886–1968), US Attorney General and judge in Nuremberg trials
George Biddle (1885–1973), American artist
James Biddle (1783–1848), American naval officer
Jesse Biddle (born 1991), American professional baseball player from Philadelphia
John Biddle (Michigan politician) (1792–1859), American politician and congressman
John Biddle (yachting cinematographer) (1925–2008), America's Cup Hall of Fame cinematographer and lecturer
Livingston L. Biddle Jr. (1918–2002), American third chairman of National Endowment for the Arts
Nicholas Biddle (1786–1844), American financier
Nicholas Biddle (naval officer) (1750–1778), American naval officer
Peter Biddle (born 1966), American Microsoft engineer
Richard Biddle (1796–1847), American author and politician
Sydney Biddle Barrows (born 1952), American escort agency owner and autobiographer
Thomas Biddle (1790–1831), War of 1812 American hero killed in a duel with a congressman
William P. Biddle (1853–1923), 11th Commandant of United States Marine Corps

Others
Adrian Biddle (1952–2005), English cinematographer
Charles J. Biddle (aviator) (1890–1972), American World War I fighter pilot
Dick Biddle (born 1947), American football player and coach
Ellen Biddle Shipman (1869–1950), American landscape architect
Hester Biddle (–1697), English Quaker writer and preacher
James Biddle Eustis (1834–1884), American politician from Louisiana
John Biddle (Unitarian) (1615–1662), English Unitarian
Joseph Franklin Biddle (1871–1936), American politician from Pennsylvania
Mary Duke Biddle (1887–1960), American philanthropist
Melvin E. Biddle (1923–2010), American World War II Medal of Honor recipient
Owen Biddle (musician) (born 1977), American bass guitarist and songwriter with The Roots
Stephen Biddle (born 1959), American foreign policy scholar
Taye Biddle (born 1983), American football player
William W. Biddle (1900-1973), American psychologist